Sir George Edward Howarth (born 29 June 1949) is a British Labour Party politician who serves as the Member of Parliament (MP) for Knowsley. He also served the seat's predecessors since being elected in a by-election in 1986, firstly as the MP for Knowsley North (until 1997) and then Knowsley North and Sefton East (1997–2010).

Early life and career

Born in Prescot, Howarth was educated at the local Huyton Secondary School, the Kirkby College of Further Education, and the Liverpool John Moores University. He went on to study at the University of Salford. He served his apprenticeship for four years from 1966 as an engineer, and then worked as an engineer until 1975 when he moved into teaching.

In 1980 he joined Cooperative Development Services, and in 1982 was appointed the Chief Executive at the Wales Cooperative Centre. He became the Chief Executive of the Wales Trades Union Congress sponsored Centre in Cardiff, a position he held before his election to the House of Commons.

Howarth was elected as a councillor to the Huyton District Council in 1971 and served in its successor the Knowsley Borough Council until 1986, becoming its deputy leader from 1982 to 1983. He was the chair of the Knowsley South Constituency Labour Party for four years from 1981.

Parliamentary career

The sitting Labour MP for Knowsley North, Robert Kilroy-Silk, resigned from Parliament in 1986 mid term to follow a career with the BBC. In the by-election on 13 November 1986, Howarth was elected with a safe majority of 6,724. He subsequently became MP for Knowsley North & Sefton East in 1997 and Knowsley in 2010 as constituency boundaries were redrawn. In the 2017 general election, he received 85% of the vote and the greatest majority for a British MP since the advent of universal suffrage.

He served as an opposition spokesperson on Environment 1989–1994 and Home Affairs 1994–1997. In 1997, he was appointed Parliamentary Under Secretary of State at the Home Office, and in 1999 to the same position at the Northern Ireland Office. He left the government in 2001. He has served on a wide variety of select committees. He became a member of the Privy Council in 2005.

Howarth helped to enact the modern postal voting system.  By 1999, the system of postal and proxy voting for those unable to vote at polling stations was seen as cumbersome and complex. Howarth, as Minister of State at the Home Office, chaired the Working Party on Electoral Procedures, which recommended that: absent voting should be allowed on demand and that the application and voting procedures for absent voting should be simplified. The Representation of the People Act 2000 implemented the recommendations. The Representation of the People (England & Wales) Regulations 2001 introduced the changes to the absent voting arrangements from 16 February 2001. The main change was to allow postal voting on demand.

Howarth was appointed one of two temporary Deputy Speakers of the House after the 2015 Queens Speech, until the new deputy speakers were elected on 3 June 2015. Following the 2017 Queens Speech, Howarth again served until the new deputy speakers were elected on 28 June 2017 without standing for the position himself.

He supported Owen Smith in the failed attempt to replace Jeremy Corbyn in the 2016 Labour leadership election.

Howarth was knighted in the 2019 Birthday Honours. He briefly acted as First Deputy Chairman of Ways and Means at the start of the 58th Parliament.

Personal life
In 2011, Howarth's daughter, Sián, died at the age of 24 due to complications from Type 1 diabetes.

References

External links
 George Howarth, Labour MP for Knowsley  official biography
 
 Guardian Unlimited Politics – Ask Aristotle: George Howarth MP
 

1949 births
Living people
Alumni of Liverpool John Moores University
Alumni of the University of Salford
Amalgamated Engineering Union-sponsored MPs
Labour Party (UK) MPs for English constituencies
Members of the Privy Council of the United Kingdom
Northern Ireland Office junior ministers
Politicians from Liverpool
UK MPs 1983–1987
UK MPs 1987–1992
UK MPs 1992–1997
UK MPs 1997–2001
UK MPs 2001–2005
UK MPs 2005–2010
UK MPs 2010–2015
UK MPs 2015–2017
UK MPs 2017–2019
UK MPs 2019–present
Knights Bachelor
Politicians awarded knighthoods